Tchernichovsky Prize is an Israeli prize awarded to individuals for exemplary works of translation into Hebrew.

History
The Tchernichovsky Prize is awarded by the municipality of Tel Aviv-Yafo. Although initially awarded annually, it is now awarded every two years.

The prize was founded, in the name of the poet Shaul Tchernichovsky, following a 1942 resolution of the municipality.  Tchernichovsky himself participated in formulating the policies for the grant of the award and attended the first award ceremony for the prize in 1943.

Recipients 
 Saul Adler
 Nathan Alterman
 Aharon Amir, 1951
 Hugo Bergmann
 Isaac Dov Berkowitz
 Ya'akov Cohen (writer)
 Shlomo Dykman
 Israel Eldad
 Ran HaCohen
 Shlomo Herberg
 Ephraim Katzir
, 1951
 Levana Moshon, 1995
 Tal Nitzán
, 1951
 Rami Saari
 Aharon Shabtai
 Abraham Schalit
 David Shimoni
 Avraham Shlonsky
Eisig Silberschlag, 1951
 Leon Simon (Zionist)
 Reuven Snir
 Joseph Gerhard Liebes

References

Hebrew literary awards
Israeli literary awards
Jewish literary awards
Israeli awards
Awards by the municipality of Tel Aviv-Yafo
Awards established in 1942
Translation awards
1942 establishments in Mandatory Palestine